Mickaël Crispin (born ) is a French cyclo-cross cyclist. In 2019 he won the U-23 European Championship, and finished second at the French U23 Championship. Throughout the same 2019-2020 season, Mickael recorded five other podium finishes in the U-23 ranks, principally competing in his native France. As a junior rider, he won the silver medal in the men's junior event at the 2016 UCI Cyclo-cross World Championships in Heusden-Zolder.

Major results

2014–2015
 2nd Junior Quelneuc
2015–2016
 2nd  UCI World Junior Championships
 1st Overall Junior Coupe de France
2nd Albi
2nd Flamanville
 UCI Junior World Cup
3rd Lignières-en-Berry
2018–2019
 3rd Overall Under-23 Coupe de France
3rd Flamanville
2019–2020
 1st  UEC European Under-23 Championships
 1st Overall Under-23 Coupe de France
1st Andrezieux-Boutheon
1st Bagnoles de l'Orne
2nd La Meziere
 2nd National Under-23 Championships
 3rd Topolcianky
2020–2021
 Toi Toi Cup
3rd Mlada Boleslav

References

External links
 Profile at cyclingarchives.com

1998 births
Living people
Cyclo-cross cyclists
French male cyclists
Place of birth missing (living people)